State Road 161 (NM 161) is a  state highway in northeastern New Mexico. NM 161 begins in the west at its junction with NM 518 several miles south of the unincorporated community of La Cueva. The road travels southeast through remote, sparsely populated land before reaching a junction with Interstate 25 (I-25) south of Watrous. From there, the road turns northeast and briefly parallels I-25 before cutting back to the northwest, where it intersects I-25 again, then continues north for roughly seven miles before terminating at Fort Union National Monument. Shortly before reaching Fort Union, NM 161 crosses the former path of the Santa Fe Trail which is still visible as a broad, shallow ditch or low spot in the terrain.

Major intersections

See also

References

External links

161
Transportation in Mora County, New Mexico